Huron County is a county in the U.S. state of Michigan. As of the 2020 Census, the population was 31,407. The county seat is Bad Axe.
Huron County is at the northern tip of the Thumb, which is a sub region of Mid Michigan. Huron County's most important industry is agriculture, as with most of the other Thumb counties. Huron County enjoys seasonal tourism from large cities such as Detroit, Flint, and Saginaw. A lot of the tourism is in the Port Austin and Caseville area.

History
Huron County was originally attached to neighboring Sanilac and Tuscola counties. It was created by Michigan law on April 1, 1840, and was fully organized by an Act of Legislature on January 25, 1859. Sand Beach (now Harbor Beach) was the county seat until 1865, when the court house burned, destroying most of its records. The county seat was moved to Port Austin and remained there until 1873, when the county's Board of Supervisors designated Bad Axe as the county seat.

The name Huron was derived from the word "hures" as used in the phrase "În elles hures" (what heads) as applied by an astonished French traveler to the Wyandotte (Huron) Indians on beholding their mode of dressing the hair. During 1649 and the Beaver Wars of the mid-17th century, the Iroquois from the areas of New York and Pennsylvania drove out the Wyandotte, in order to control the fur trade.

In the 17th and early 18th century in this region, the Thumb of Michigan, the Wyandotte suffix "onti" or "ondi" was used in place names such as Skenchioetontius and E. Kandechiondius. "Onti" means to "jut out". The name Wyandotte, Huron descendants, was said to mean "dwellers of the peninsula". A headland or peninsula in Onondaga, an Iroquoian language, is "onoentoto".

In the early 18th century, the Thumb of Michigan was said to have the best beaver hunting in America. The Detroit region was called Tio-sahr-ondion, "where it is beaver dams athwart many". This was near Skenchioe [now Huron and Sanilac counties].

About 1700, French maps indicated the region of Saginaw and the Thumb of Michigan as "Chasse des caster des amis de François", "the beaver hunting grounds of the friends of Francis."

Geography

Huron county is heavily agricultural. The county is generally flat, with some rolling hills.

Adjacent counties
By land
 Sanilac County  (southeast)
 Tuscola County  (southwest)
By water

 Arenac County (northwest)
 Iosco County (northwest)

Highways
  - runs north and south through the southern half of the county
  - runs along the outer edge of the county, along the shore of Lake Huron and Saginaw Bay
  - runs north and south through the central part of the county
  - runs east and west through the central part of the county

Demographics

The 2010 United States Census indicates Huron County had a 2010 population of 33,118. This decrease of -2,961 people from the 2000 United States Census represents an 8.2% decrease. In 2010 there were 14,348 households and 9,328 families in the county. The population density was 39.6 per square mile (15.3 per km2). There were 21,199 housing units at an average density of 25.4 per square mile (9.8 per km2). 97.5% of the population were White, 0.4% Asian, 0.4% Black or African American, 0.3% Native American, 0.4% of some other race and 0.9% of two or more races. 2.0% were Hispanic or Latino (of any race). 41.1% were of German, 15.9% Polish, 6.8% Irish, 6.1% English and 6.0% American ancestry.

There were 14,348 households, out of which 24.7% had children under the age of 18 living with them, 52.7% were husband and wife families, 8.1% had a female householder with no husband present, 35.0% were non-families, and 30.7% were made up of individuals. The average household size was 2.27 and the average family size was 2.81.

In the county, the population was spread out, with 20.7% under age of 18, 6.4% from 18 to 24, 20.4% from 25 to 44, 30.8% from 45 to 64, and 21.7% who were 65 years of age or older. The median age was 47 years. For every 100 females there were 98.5 males. For every 100 females age 18 and over, there were 97.3 males.

The 2010 American Community Survey 3-year estimate indicates the median income for a household in the county was $38,789 and the median income for a family was $46,533. Males had a median income of $26,688 versus $15,198 for females. The per capita income for the county was $21,342. About 1.4% of families and 14.4% of the population were below the poverty line, including 19.7% of those under the age 18 and 10.4% of those age 65 or over.

Religion
 The United Methodist Church has a  presence. 
 The Roman Catholic Diocese of Saginaw is the controlling regional body for the Catholic Church.
 All Episcopal parishes are members of the Episcopal Diocese of Eastern Michigan
 The Church of Jesus Christ of Latter-day Saints has one meetinghouse in Huron County.

Government
The county government operates the jail, maintains rural roads, operates the major local courts, records deeds, mortgages, and vital records, administers public health regulations, and participates with the state in the provision of social services. The county board of commissioners controls the budget and has limited authority to make laws or ordinances. In Michigan, most local government functions — police and fire, building and zoning, tax assessment, street maintenance, etc. — are the responsibility of individual cities and townships.

Elected officials

 Prosecuting Attorney: Timothy J. Rutkowski
 Sheriff: Kelly J. Hanson
 County Clerk: Lori S. Neal 
 County Treasurer: Deb McCollum
 Register of Deeds: Sarah Durr
 Circuit Court Judge: Hon. M. Gerald M. Prill
 Probate Court Judge: Hon. David L. Clabuesch
 District Court Judge: Hon. David B. Herrington
 Commissioner Dist 1: Sami Khoury (R)
 Commissioner Dist 2: Michael Meissner (R)
 Commissioner Dist 3: Todd Talaski (R)
 Commissioner Dist 4: Steve Vaughan (R)
 Commissioner Dist 5: John L. Bodis (R)
 Commissioner Dist 6: Joe Murphy (R)
 Commissioner Dist 7: Mary Ellen Babcock (R)

as of 2018

Politics
Huron County voters have generally supported Republican Party candidates. Since 1884, they have selected the Republican Party nominee in 79% of national elections (27 of 34). In 2016, Donald Trump carried the county by the largest margin in 32 years.

Parks and recreation
Tourism is important to Huron County with bay front and lakefront towns such as Sebewaing, Caseville, Port Austin, Port Hope, and Harbor Beach, attracting tourists from all over. Huron County borders the Saginaw Bay and Lake Huron. There are two state parks – Sleeper State Park and Port Crescent State Park – and three roadside parks – Jenks Park, Brown Park, and White Rock Park. Huron County also maintains eight county parks along the shoreline – Caseville Park, Lighthouse Park, Stafford Park, McGraw Park, Philp Park, Wagener Park, Oak Beach Park, and Sebewaing Park.

Communities

Cities
 Bad Axe (county seat)
 Caseville
 Harbor Beach

Villages
 Elkton
 Kinde
 Owendale
 Pigeon
 Port Austin
 Port Hope
 Sebewaing
 Ubly

Civil townships

 Bingham Township
 Bloomfield Township
 Brookfield Township
 Caseville Township
 Chandler Township
 Colfax Township
 Dwight Township
 Fairhaven Township
 Gore Township
 Grant Township
 Hume Township
 Huron Township
 Lake Township
 Lincoln Township
 McKinley Township
 Meade Township
 Oliver Township
 Paris Township
 Pointe Aux Barques Township
 Port Austin Township
 Rubicon Township
 Sand Beach Township
 Sebewaing Township
 Sheridan Township
 Sherman Township
 Sigel Township
 Verona Township
 Winsor Township

Census-designated place
 Bay Port

Other unincorporated communities

 Bach
 Berne
 Cracow
 Filion
 Glencoe
 Grindstone City
 Helena
 Huron City
 Ivanhoe
 Kilmanagh
 Lewisville
 Linkville
 Parisville
 Pawlowski
 Pinnebog
 Pointe aux Barques
 Popple
 Rapson
 Redman
 Rose Island
 Ruth
 Valley Island
 Verona
 Weale
 White Rock

See also

 List of Michigan State Historic Sites in Huron County, Michigan
 National Register of Historic Places listings in Huron County, Michigan

References

External links
 Huron County website
 Huron County economic development corporation
 
 Huron County Historical Society (Michigan), Huron County, Michigan. (2001, Arcadia Publishing).
 Huron County View (newspaper)
 Huron Daily Tribune (newspaper)

 
Michigan counties
1859 establishments in Michigan
Populated places established in 1859